Federigo Luigi Appelius (1835-20 April 1876, Livorno) was an Italian conchologist. 
His mother was Italian and his father was a German speaking Swiss so he was bilingual.
He published : Le Conchiglie del Mar Tirreno, parte prima (pp. 1–27), parte seconda (pp. 1–49). Pisa, Tipografia Nistri (1869); Catalogo delle conchiglie fossili del Livornese desunto dalle collezioni e manoscritti del defunto G. B. Caterini. Bulletino Malacologico Italiano, Pisa, vol. III (1871) ; Osservazioni bibliografiche sui molluschi del Mar Rosso. Bullettino Malacologico Italiano, 6: 12-24 (1873) and short papers.

References
Nachrichtsblatt der Deutschen Malakozoologischen Gesellschaft 8 pdf
 H. Crosse & P. Fischer, 1877. Nécrologie. Journal de Conchyliologie 25(1): 97
Biographical Etymology of Marine Organism Names (BEMON) 

Italian zoologists
1876 deaths
1835 births